Tyler Nelson (born August 9, 1995) is an American professional basketball player for the Rostock Seawolves of the German Basketball Bundesliga. He played college basketball for the Fairfield Stags.

High school career
Nelson is the son Anne Marie Nelson, a high school teacher and Jeffrey Nelson, a high school teacher and NBA scout with the Los Angeles Lakers, and brother to Alyssa Nelson, a math teacher. He grew up in Bradford, Massachusetts. He attended Central Catholic High School and starred on the basketball team. He led Catholic to the Massachusetts Division I championship game. He was named Massachusetts's Gatorade Player of the Year.  Fairfield assistant Martin Bahar convinced him to join the program.

College career
As a freshman, Nelson averaged 9.7 points per game on a 7-24 team and was named to the All-Metro Atlantic Athletic Conference Freshman Team. He averaged 16.0 points per game as a sophomore as Fairfield's record improved to 19-14 and the Stags took part in the CollegeInsider.com Tournament. Nelson was named to the Second Team All-MAAC as a sophomore. He posted 19.5 points per game as a junior as Fairfield went 16-15 and again appeared in the CollegeInsider.com Tournament.

On February 15, 2018, Nelson scored his 2,000th career point in an 83-79 win over Marist. He had 32 points in a win over Quinnipiac on February 17. As a senior, he averaged 22.2 points, 4.2 rebounds and 3.3 assists per game. He earned First Team All-MAAC honors for the second straight season. He finished his career with 2,172 points, the most in school history.

Professional career

Greensboro Swarm (2018–2020)
After going undrafted in the 2018 NBA Draft, Nelson was signed by the Minnesota Timberwolves in the NBA Summer League and appeared in three games, averaging 1.3 points per game. Nelson was selected with the third overall pick of the 2018 NBA G League draft by the Greensboro Swarm. He subsequently was added to the Swarm's training camp roster.

Texas Legends (2020)
On February 28, 2020, Nelson was traded to the Texas Legends alongside Josh Perkins in exchange for Quincy Acy and a second-round pick in the 2020 G League draft. On November 23, 2019, Nelson recorded 17 points, one rebound, one assist and one steal in a win over the Windy City Bulls.

Rostock Seawolves (2021–present)
On January 22, 2021, Nelson signed with the Rostock Seawolves of the German Basketball_Bundesliga.

References

External links 
Fairfield Stags bio

1995 births
Living people
American expatriate basketball people in Estonia
American men's basketball players
Basketball players from Massachusetts
Fairfield Stags men's basketball players
Greensboro Swarm players
People from Bradford, Massachusetts
Point guards
Rostock Seawolves players
Sportspeople from Haverhill, Massachusetts
Texas Legends players